Yussur A. F. Abrar is a Somali banker and entrepreneur. She previously served as Vice-President at Citigroup, as well as Vice-President of Credit Risk Management at the American International Group in New York City. Abrar is also the founder and President of Warsun International Communications Corp. From September to November 2013, she was the Governor of the Central Bank of Somalia.

Background

Personal life
Abrar was born in the northwestern town of Borama, Somaliland. She hails from the Gadabuursi/Samaroon clan.

She later pursued her post-secondary education in the United States, earning a bachelor's degree from the Oklahoma State University. She also holds an M.B.A. from the same institution.

Early career
In a professional capacity, Abrar has over three decades of experience in banking, risk management and insurance.

She is the founder and President of Warsun International Communications Corp., a telecommunications company with a focus on internet accessibility. As of 2002, the firm was headquartered in Vienna, Virginia and employed around 50 workers.

Abrar previously also acted as the Vice President at Citigroup. Additionally, she was Vice President of Credit Risk Management at the American International Group (AIG) in New York City, one of the world's largest insurance companies.

Abrar has likewise served as a financial consultant.

Central Bank of Somalia
On 13 September 2013, Abrar was appointed the Governor of the Central Bank of Somalia by incumbent President Hassan Sheikh Mohamud. She succeeded Abdisalam Omer in the position and is the first woman to have been appointed to the post.

Abrar's first announced priorities included revitalizing the national financial system through the issuance of licenses to banks and other financial institutions, collaborating with stakeholders on the remittance market, strengthening the regulation framework to ensure fiscal responsibility and transparency, and instituting monetary policy vis-a-vis job creation to galvanize economic development and growth.

On 1 November 2013, Abrar stepped down from her position as Somalia's Central Bank Governor. In a formal letter of resignation, she cited interference with the bank's functions as among the main reasons for her departure, as well as pressure to sanction deals that she believed were in violation of her fiduciary responsibility as head of the national monetary authority. Abrar was succeeded at the position by Bashir Isse, who was appointed on 27 November 2013.

Citations

External links
 Global-Digital Communications company contact information (includes Abrar as the contact)

American people of Somali descent
Ethnic Somali people
Gadabuursi
Governors of Central Bank of Somalia
Living people
Oklahoma State University alumni
People from Awdal
Somalian economists
Somalian expatriates in the United States
Year of birth missing (living people)